BGGS may refer to:

 Bradford Girls' Grammar School
 Brisbane Girls Grammar School
 Brigadier-General, General Staff